The Reno earthquakes of 2008, also known as the "Mogul-Somersett earthquake sequence",  occurred in or near the western Reno, Nevada, suburbs of Mogul and Somersett. The earthquake swarm began in February 2008, but the first significant quake of the series occurred on April 15, 2008, registering a 3.6 magnitude. On April 24, 2008, two quakes in the same area registered 4.1 and 4.2. On April 25, 2008, the quake of largest magnitude occurred, registering 4.7 on the Richter scale and causing damage in the immediate area around the epicenter, including destroying  of a wooden flume supplying water from the Highland Ditch, also known as the Highland Ditch flume. The flume carried up to  a day from the Highland Ditch to  Reno's Chalk Bluff Water Treatment Facility and another  to area irrigation users.

In addition to these significant quakes, hundreds of smaller events have also occurred in the same area. This swarm is significant because no known dominant fault line has been responsible for the earthquake swarm occurring in the region. It is also highly unusual because the quakes have, for the most part, been limited to a three-mile area. The United States Geological Survey (USGS) estimates that over 620 earthquakes have occurred in the general three mile vicinity since the swarm has been monitored. Seismologists with the USGS as well as the Nevada Seismological Laboratory expressed concern that the increasing magnitude of the felt quakes may indicate that a larger earthquake was imminent.  As yet, they have not identified the particular tectonics involved with these earthquakes.  However, they have stated categorically that volcanic activity is not involved. The last strong earthquake (M6.1) in the Reno area in occurred on April 24, 1914, and the state's most powerful quake to date was the M7.4 1915 Pleasant Valley earthquake south of Winnemucca.

References

Additional reading

External links
Nevada Earthquake Information – United States Geological Survey
Mogul-Somersett Earthquake Sequence; West Reno, Nevada – Nevada Seismological Laboratory
Pumps to feed water plant – Nevada Division of Environmental Protection News
Exceptional Ground Motions from the April 26, 2008 Mogul Nevada Mw 5.0 Earthquake Recorded by PASSCAL Rapid Array Mobilization Program (RAMP) Stations – IRIS Consortium

2008 earthquakes
2008 natural disasters in the United States
Earthquakes in Nevada
Reno earthquakes
April 2008 events in the United States
Earthquake clusters, swarms, and sequences